Deroxena is a genus of moths in the Gelechioidea subfamily Autostichinae, which is either placed in the Oecophoridae or in an expanded Autostichidae.

Species
Deroxena conioleuca Meyrick, 1926
Deroxena venosulella (Möschler, 1862)

References

Autostichinae